The Shepherds (French - Les Bergers) is a c. 1717 painting by Antoine Watteau, now in the Schloss Charlottenburg in Berlin. It is the most finished version of a composition later reused by the same artist in Pastoral Pleasure (c.1714-1716, musée Condé).

Description and themes
It shows city-dwellers in the countryside pretending to be peasants. In the centre a young man dressed in an elegant doublet and a plumed beret dances what seems to be a minuet with a young woman in a satin dress whilst a musician plays for them. One other couple observes the dancers, another couple whispers to each other and a third plays with a swing. Several details are directly inspired by the work of Peter Paul Rubens - the musician, his neighbour, the shepherd embracing the woman next to him and the dog in the foreground. The affected character of the scene is heightened by the presence of a real shepherd, whose sheep graze in the far right background, almost hidden by bushes. Overall the painting transposes French pastoral poetry of the time into painted form.

It refers to Poussin's Bergers d’Arcadie, but this is misleading since the pastoral paintings by Poussin show a mythological Arcadia peopled by idealised classical shepherds, with no trace of real contemporary shepherds. The shepherds painted by Watteau and written about by Fontenelle are instead 'half-true', as Fontenelle himself later explained:

The style is close to the shepherd-lovers and wrapped-up shepherdesses of abbé Du Bos. The figures' harmony with nature in Watteau's work was a convention in an aristocratic society which emulated a idealised pastoral state in the gardens of Versailles.

Analysis

References

Further reading

 
 
 
 
 
 
 
 
 
 
 
   . Published in French as

External links
 

Musical instruments in art
Dogs in art
Paintings by Antoine Watteau
1710s paintings
Paintings in Schloss Charlottenburg